HZP may refer to:
 Fort MacKay/Horizon Airport, in Alberta, Canada
 Hamerton Zoo Park, in England
 Hazurpur railway station, in Pakistan
 Padmaja Naidu Himalayan Zoological Park, in Darjeeling, West Bengal, India